Morgan Creek is a stream in Hickman County, Tennessee, in the United States. It is a tributary of Duck River.

Morgan Creek was named for a pioneer who settled near its banks in 1815.

See also
List of rivers of Tennessee

References

Rivers of Hickman County, Tennessee
Rivers of Tennessee